Laurentian, or St. Lawrence Iroquoian, was an Iroquoian language spoken until the late 16th century along the shores of the Saint Lawrence River in present-day Quebec and Ontario, Canada. It is believed to have disappeared with the extinction of the St. Lawrence Iroquoians, likely as a result of warfare by the more powerful Mohawk from the Haudenosaunee or Iroquois Confederacy to the south, in present-day New York state of the United States.

History

The explorer Jacques Cartier observed in 1535 and 1536 about a dozen villages in the valley between Stadacona and Hochelega, the sites of the modern cities of Quebec City and Montreal. Archeologists have unearthed other villages farther west, near the eastern end of Lake Ontario. St. Lawrence Iroquoians lived in villages which were usually located a few kilometres (miles) inland from the Saint-Lawrence River, and were often enclosed by a wooden palisade. Up to 2000 persons lived in the larger villages.

By the time the explorer Samuel de Champlain arrived in 1608, however, he found no trace of the Iroquoians visited by Jacques Cartier some 75 years earlier. Scholars have developed several theories to explain the complete disappearance of the St. Lawrence Iroquoians, among them devastating wars waged by the Mohawk from the south, epidemics of Old World infectious diseases, or migration towards the Great Lakes region. Archeological evidence points most strongly to devastating wars with neighbouring Iroquoian tribes, the Huron and the nations of the Iroquois League, especially the Mohawk.

Classification
Several dialects of Laurentian may have existed in the 16th century in the St. Lawrence River valley. The sparse records made by Jacques Cartier during his voyages cannot be considered conclusive, and the Laurentians may have spoken several distinct languages. A few Laurentian words are still in use today as toponyms: most notably the word , meaning "village" in Laurentian. Jacques Cartier used the word to describe both the region and the river that crosses it. The name of Donnacona, the Iroquoian chieftain Cartier met at Stadacona, remains in use as the name of the town of Donnacona, Quebec. Hochelaga remains in use in the Montreal borough of Hochelaga-Maisonneuve and the alternate spelling "Osheaga" serves as the name of Montreal's annual Osheaga Festival.

On the basis of the Laurentian vocabularies of Cartier, the linguist Marianne Mithun concludes that Laurentian was an Iroquoian language, and its speakers were "clearly in contact with the Lake Iroquoian peoples [Huron and Iroquois]" (Mithun, 1981).

Vocabulary
In 1545 Jacques Cartier published a journal of his voyages, including the first list of Laurentian words. Here are some examples (numbers and parts of the human body), as written by Cartier:

A second shorter vocabulary list was appended to his journal of his first voyage, which was published much later, first in Italian and later in English and French.

References

Jacques Cartier. (1545). Relation originale de Jacques Cartier. Paris: Tross (1863 edition). (Vocabulary list on pages 46 to 48)
Floyd G. Lounsbury. (1978). "Iroquoian Languages," Handbook of North American Indians. Volume 15. Pages 334-343.
Juan Francisco Maura. (2009). "Nuevas aportaciones al estudio de la toponimia ibérica en la América Septentrional en el siglo XVI". Bulletin of Spanish Studies 86. 5 (2009): 577-603.
Marianne Mithun. (1979). "Iroquoian," in Lyle Campbell and Marianne Mithun, The Languages of Native America. Austin: University of Texas Press. Pages 140-141. ("Laurentian")
Marianne Mithun. (1981). The Mystery of the Vanished Laurentians, in Papers from the 5th International Congress on Historical Linguistics (Anders Ahlquist, ed.). Amsterdam: John Benjamins. Pages 230-242.
Marianne Mithun. (1999). The languages of Native North America. Cambridge: Cambridge University Press.  (hbk); .
James F. Pendergast. (1998). "The Confusing Identities Attributed to Stadacona and Hochelaga", Journal of Canadian Studies. Volume 32. Pages 149-167.
Bruce G. Trigger and James F. Pendergast. (1978). "Saint Lawrence Iroquoians", Handbook of North American Indians. Volume 15. Pages 357-361.
Bruce G. Trigger. (1976). The Children of Aataentsic: a History of the Huron People to 1660. Montreal: McGill-Queen's Press. pp. 214–228. ("The Disappearance of the St. Lawrence Iroquoians")

External links
List of Web sites on the Laurentian language (Native Languages of the Americas Online Resources)
Laurentian words

Iroquoian languages
Indigenous languages of the North American eastern woodlands
Extinct languages of North America
First Nations languages in Canada
First Nations history in Ontario
First Nations history in Quebec
Native American history of New York (state)
Languages extinct in the 16th century
16th-century disestablishments in North America